New Market is a town in Frederick County, Maryland, United States. The population was 1,525 at the 2020 census. The town bills itself as the "Antiques capital of Maryland".

Geography

History
When Frederick, Maryland began being settled in 1745, trade routes between Frederick and Baltimore emerged.  Present-day New Market developed along this road, which later was improved. It became known as the National Road and the Gateway to the West.  In 1926, U.S. Route 40, a major coast-to-coast highway, was constructed and designated along the former National Road.

To accommodate travelers along this important colonial road, Nicholas Hall tried to plat the town of New Market in 1788. He likely had disputes with William Plummer, an owner of adjoining land and was unable to complete the project.  On August 1, 1792, William Plummer laid out 36 lots for the town.   Later, on January 29, 1793, Nicholas Hall laid out an additional 134 lots.  On June 1, 1793, the first 19 lots were sold, initiating the town of New Market.  As time passed, the town developed as an important stopping point along the route. Residents developed churches, hotels, inns, a post office, taverns, blacksmith shops, and other crucial services, including doctors.

The New Market Historic District was listed on the National Register of Historic Places in 1975. Henry Nelson House was listed on the NRHP in 1980 and Drummine Farm in 1987.

Antiques Capital of Maryland
New Market was once known as the "Antiques Capital of Maryland". Downtown New Market once had a number of small shops specializing in the sale of antiques and other goods. While antiques tourism occurs year-round, New Market holds events and festivals that highlight the town's historic past. "Christmas in New Market" is held on the first Saturday in December every year.  From June through October each year, New Market hosts periodic 2nd Saturday events, featuring artists, food, vendors, free concerts, and movies. A "Day in New Market" festival was formerly held annually on the first Saturday in May. The town has also been popular with photographers, plein-air painters, and historical re-enactors.

Demographics

2010 census
As of the census of 2010, there were 656 people, 231 households, and 187 families residing in the town. The racial makeup of the town was 89.5% White, 5.5% African American, 0.3% Native American, 2.3% Asian, 0.9% from other races, and 1.5% from two or more races. Hispanic or Latino of any race were 3.5% of the population.

There were 231 households, of which 50.2% had children under the age of 18 living with them, 65.4% were married couples living together, 11.3% had a female householder with no husband present, 4.3% had a male householder with no wife present, and 19.0% were non-families. 14.7% of all households were made up of individuals, and 3.9% had someone living alone who was 65 years of age or older. The average household size was 2.84 and the average family size was 3.11.

The median age in the town was 36.3 years. 29.6% of residents were under the age of 18; 6.7% were between the ages of 18 and 24; 30.8% were from 25 to 44; 25.5% were from 45 to 64; and 7.5% were 65 years of age or older. The gender makeup of the town was 47.4% male and 52.6% female.

2000 census
According to the 2000 Census, there were 159 households, out of which 38.4% had children under the age of 18 living with them, 57.2% were married couples living together, 10.7% had a female householder with no husband present, and 29.6% were non-families. 23.3% of all households were made up of individuals, and 3.8% had someone living alone who was 65 years of age or older. The average household size was 2.69 and the average family size was 3.24.

The median income for a household in the town was $62,292, and the median income for a family was $67,292. Males had a median income of $45,455 versus $25,313 for females. The per capita income for the town was $22,102. None of the families and 0.7% of the population were living below the poverty line, including no under eighteens and 6.9% of those over 64.

Education

Residents feed into four schools: New Market Elementary School, Oakdale Elementary School, New Market Middle School, Oakdale Middle School, Oakdale High School and Linganore High School.

Transportation

The primary means of travel to and from New Market is by road. The main highway serving New Market is Interstate 70 and U.S. Route 40, which run concurrently through the town. I-70 and US 40 connects eastward to Baltimore and westward to Frederick and Hagerstown. Maryland Route 75 also serves New Market, connecting northward to Libertytown and south to Hyattstown. Maryland Route 144 connects the center of town to MD 75 via Main Street.

Notable people
 John Vincent Atanasoff, Bulgarian-American inventor, created the first binary computer, Atanasoff–Berry Computer, writing the concept in 1937 on a cocktail napkin after having a few glasses of scotch whiskey.
 William Plummer Benton, New Market native who served as a general from Indiana in the American Civil War
 Alex Ghaderi, Social media personality, political figure, and celebrity real estate mogul.

See also
 New Market Historic District

References

External links

 Official website of the town.  Includes detailed history.
 News story concerning Adventure Park USA-source for much info added
 New Market VFD #15 Official Website of the New Market Volunteer Fire Department 

Towns in Maryland
Towns in Frederick County, Maryland